Working with God is the 24th album by American rock band Melvins, released on February 26, 2021, through Ipecac Recordings.

It was elected by Loudwire as the 32nd best rock/metal album of 2021.

Track listing

References

Melvins albums
2021 albums
Ipecac Recordings albums